Elfstone can refer to:

Novel 
The Elfstones of Shannara - an epic fantasy novel from the Shannara series of novels by Terry Brooks.

Objects 
Elfstones - in the Shannara series by Terry Brooks, "elfstones" are magical stones from the Age of Faerie that hold great power.
Elfstone - in J. R. R. Tolkien's fantasy writings, the Elfstone is a famous green jewel that Galadriel gives as a gift to Aragorn; it is also known as the "Elessar" or the "Stone of Eärendil".

ru:Список артефактов Средиземья#Элессар